WKVU (107.3 FM) is a radio station broadcasting a Contemporary Christian format. Licensed to Utica, New York, United States, the station serves the Utica-Rome area.  The station is currently owned by the Educational Media Foundation, and is an affiliate of the K-Love network.

History

WKVU signed on in 2001 on 100.7 FM, when Bethany Broadcasting sold its religious station broadcasting on that frequency, WVVC, to the Educational Media Foundation. Upon acquiring WVVC, EMF changed its call letters to WKVU and began simulcasting its K-Love satellite format of Contemporary Christian music on the station.

Its current frequency was previously owned by Galaxy Communications, who ran a classic rock format on the frequency under the callsign WRCK and slogan Rock 107. Prior to this WRCK was a longtime powerhouse Top 40 station. During this time, WRCK was known as Power Hits Rock 107 until March 17, 1994 when they changed their name to Hot 107. However, their Top 40 format lasted until June 1994 when The Radio Corporation (now Galaxy Communications) purchased the station from H & D Entertainment Incorporated saddening and upsetting listeners who listened to Top 40 music in the Utica-Rome area about the takeover and format change to classic rock. In October 2007 Galaxy purchased a portion of Clear Channel Communications' Utica cluster, including WRCK's rival, WOUR. WOUR's signal was deemed to be stronger and more favorable than WRCK's and so WRCK was spun off to EMF. Some of WRCK's former staff moved to WOUR. EMF then announced that it would keep the WRCK call letters and simulcast their Christian rock satellite format Air 1 on the station. WRCK's last song as Rock 107 was Led Zeppelin's "Stairway to Heaven" before the Air 1 satellite feed was picked up.

Back during the early 1980s, the WRCK calls belonged to ABC Radio Networks owned-and-operated WRCK-FM 95 (dial position 94.7) in Chicago.  In 1980, the station changed its calls to WLS-FM to join with its sister AM station, WLS-AM, while the WRCK calls went to 107.3 FM.

On December 15, 2010, WRCK swapped frequencies with WKVU, with WRCK (and its Air 1 affiliation) moving to 100.7 FM and WKVU moving to 107.3 FM. The next year, EMF sold WRCK to Ken Roser, who renamed the station WUTQ-FM and began simulcasting the full service soft adult contemporary format then heard on sister stations WUTQ and WADR, which assumed the WRCK call letters. EMF then moved its Air 1 affiliation to WOKR, which would change its call letters to WARW in January 2015.

Former on-air staff
Gomez and Dave (Mornings as classic rock now on WOUR)
Paul Szmal
Bill Keeler (Morning announcer under the Top 40 & classic rock formats)
Gary Spears
Frank McBride
J.P. Marks
Bill Whiteman
'Big' Larry Williams (deceased)
B.B. Good 
Bud in the Night Time
John Carucci
JR Jim Reitz (deceased)
Karen Hanna (deceased)
Scott Burton
Ugly Michaels Mike Hotaling
Kevin Quinn
Sherry
Rich Lundy Bramley
Nick at Night Norod
Kelly Steve Abel
Rick Pendleton
Becky Williams
Janet Bauer
Kym Charmicheal

References

External links

KVU
K-Love radio stations
Educational Media Foundation radio stations